The International Security Alliance (ISA) is a fictional spy agency on the soap opera Days of Our Lives, several of whose agents have either had some connection with, or have been operating in, the fictional Midwestern city of Salem at least since the early 1980s.

Several of Salem's more recognizable citizens have served at one time or another as agents for the ISA, including Roman Brady, John Black, Steve Johnson, and Rafe Hernandez. Agents formerly on the show include Shane Donovan, Bo Brady, Hope Brady, Orpheus, Billie Reed, and Philip Kiriakis.

The agency was originally conceived on the show in the early 1980s as a multinational crime-fighting task force, well-funded and highly secretive, with agents and operations all over the world.  Made up of mostly British and American agents, the ISA's focus tends to be more toward crime-fighting than actual espionage.  The agency specializes in the sort of high-level, international criminal conspiracies that center in the otherwise quiet town of Salem -- such as those controlled by the DiMera, Kiriakis, and Alamain families, as well as the "Phantom Alliance" established by John Black's father Timothy Robecheaux (aka Yo Ling).  The multinational element is often illustrated by the fact that American agents refer to "headquarters" as being in Washington, D.C., while British agents such as the aforementioned Donovan typically report to London (in fact, the aforementioned Bo Brady made his initial contact with the ISA via the British consolate in Miami during the "Purse-Power-Pawn" storyline in 1985).

The show's writers present the ISA with a somewhat muddled (and unrealistic) mission--the criminal investigation mandate of Interpol or the FBI, combined with the methodology of the CIA or military "black ops".  Although some of the show's dialogue will refer to higher-level issues such as weapons trafficking and drug cartels, most on-screen action involving the agency deal with more mundane-seeming cases such as stolen art or a foreign country's missing national treasures - although with the implication of some severe "global impact" if the cases aren't satisfactorily solved.  

Nevertheless, many of the agency's methods come straight out of Robert Ludlum or Ian Fleming, including sophisticated gadgets, top-secret operations, and such questionable actions as kidnapping, blackmail, corruption, and assassination.  The organization works fairly openly with local police, "undercover" agents readily identify themselves as ISA members, and they have legal arrest powers in their own right.  The ISA also has several advanced scientific and medical facilities throughout the world, dealing with problems encountered by its agents such as brainwashing and biological warfare.

However effective it may be, the ISA appears to be highly susceptible to infiltration, counterespionage, and corruption by its targets.  The agency also experiences both partnerships and conflicts with real-life agencies such as the FBI and the CIA.

ISA directors depicted on the show include chiefs Nickerson, Vaughn, Tarrington, and Van Damme.  None of these officials have shied away from unsavory actions to meet their objectives, and most (except Tarrington) have proven to be outright corrupt, if not psychotic.  In fact, the agency itself occasionally finds itself acting as badly (or worse) than its targets.

Information about the limited streaming series Days of Our Lives: Beyond Salem indicate that the aforementioned Shane Donovan is the current Director of the ISA.  Previews from the second season of Beyond Salem show the front of a file folder with a label indicating that the "A" in "ISA" stands for "Agency", not "Alliance".  It is unclear whether this is an error, a retcon, or an in-universe change in the agency's name.

Fictional intelligence agencies
Days of Our Lives